Hakim Bouchouari (born 25 September 1978) is a Belgian former professional footballer who played as a forward.

References

External links
Club bio

1978 births
Living people
Belgian footballers
Footballers from Brussels
Association football forwards
Belgian Pro League players
Challenger Pro League players
K.F.C. Verbroedering Geel players
K.R.C. Mechelen players
K.V.K. Tienen-Hageland players
Sportkring Sint-Niklaas players
K.S.C. Lokeren Oost-Vlaanderen players
Standard Liège players
R.W.D.M. Brussels F.C. players
Royal Antwerp F.C. players